Brackaville or Bracaville (possibly ) is a village and townland near Coalisland in County Tyrone, Northern Ireland. It is situated in the historic barony of Dungannon Middle and the civil parish of Donaghenry and covers an area of 235 acres on the western side of Lough Neagh.

The population of the townland increased overall during the 19th century:

The townland contains one Scheduled Historic Monument:  Coalisland Works Chimneys (4), (also in Annagher townland) (grid ref: H4829 6657)

Sport
Brackaville is the home of the Gaelic Athletic Association football club Brackaville Owen Roes GFC, which became 2012 Tyrone Junior Football Champions in December 2012 after a 16-year gap.

See also
List of townlands of County Tyrone

References

Villages in County Tyrone
Townlands of County Tyrone
Barony of Dungannon Middle